Torbreck is an Australian winery in the Barossa Valley, founded by David Powell in 1994. The winery was named one of the World's Top 100 Wine Estates by Robert Parker.  The winery is named after a forest in Scotland where Powell worked as a lumberjack.  The wines are made in a style emulating those of the Rhône Valley and are made from various grapes including red grapes Shiraz, Grenache and Mataró as well as white grapes Viognier, Roussanne and Marsanne.

History 

Torbreck Vintners was founded by David Powell in 1994. He had begun working for Robert "Rocky" O'Callaghan at Rockford Wines in the Barossa Valley several years prior to that and had discovered a few sections of dry-grown old vines. that had been abandoned by their current owner because the yields were considered too low to pay for their maintenance.

Inspired to create his own label, but lacking sufficient capital for an outright purchase of grapes, Powell began to share-farm the vineyard, a practice which involves working without pay until the grapes are sold, at which time the owner is paid a percentage of the market rate for his grapes and the share-farmer keeps the grapes for their own use (see sweat equity). The share-farming principle enabled Torbreck to obtain fruit from the very best vineyards in the Barossa Valley, while at the same time giving Powell practical experience working with old vines in the vineyard and winery.

In 1995 Powell crushed three tonnes of grapes and fermented them into wine in a shed on his 12-hectare Marananga property (which continues to be home to the winery). The winery was named "Torbreck" after the forest near Inverness in Scotland where Powell had worked as a lumberjack following his university studies. The first wine made under the Torbreck label was the 1995 RunRig, with the wine released in 1997. A favorable review of the 1996 RunRig in the June, 1999 issue of The Wine Advocate created intense consumer interest in the international wine collector community, resulting in this and subsequent releases being highly allocated.

The Torbreck endeavour is based around the classic Barossa Valley grape varieties Shiraz, Grenache and Mataró, and has always been driven by Powell's love of the wines of France’s Rhône Valley. Although initially known primarily for its red wines, in recent years Torbreck has earned acclaim for wines made from the Viognier, Marsanne and Roussanne vines planted in the estate's Descendent Vineyard. Although grapes from these vines were initially intended to be used solely as blending material in the high-end red wines, fruit from this vineyard is now used in Torbreck's white blends. The winery also produces a benchmark Barossa Semillon known as Woodcutter's, made from Madeira-clone vines ranging up to 100 years old.

In late 2002 the estate was placed into receivership due to financial pressures on Powell from a divorce settlement. Torbreck was purchased by Australian businessman Jack Cowin from receivers for 6.5 million Australian dollars, with Powell retained as winemaker and managing director. In 2008 Powell reacquired the estate in partnership with Peter Kight, the owner of Quivira Winery in Sonoma County's Dry Creek Valley in California.  Kight forced David Powell to leave the winery in 2013.

Torbreck continues to source much of its fruit from selected growers from throughout the Barossa Valley but has increased its own vineyard holdings (the Hillside Vineyard in Lyndoch and the estate Descendant Vineyard adjacent to the winery's cellar door).  In most of their contracts with local growers, the winery oversees the farming regimen, continuing with their share-farm tradition.

Wines 

Torbreck produces around 70,000 cases of wine per year, depending on vintage conditions. The majority of the production is red wine, but around 10% of the total production consists of white wine. When vintage conditions are favorable, a small amount of saignée Mataró Rosé is also produced

The RunRig is Torbreck's flagship wine, produced from 120- to 160-year-old Shiraz vines and a small amount of Viognier. RunRig was included in the fourth edition of Langton's Classification of Australian Wine at the "Excellent" level and was named one of Australia's 25 "benchmark" wines by Wine Spectator magazine. The RunRig has had an unprecedented string of exceptional scores from The Wine Advocate, with no vintage scoring less than 95 points since the 1995 vintage, and no fewer than seven vintages of RunRig achieving a score of 99 points.

The Laird is a single vineyard wine sourced from Malcolm Seppelt's Gnadenfrei vineyard between Marananga and Seppeltsfield. Planted in 1958, this five-acre (two Hectare) site is considered to be among the finest vineyards in all of the Barossa. Grapes are hand-harvested and immediately brought to the Torbreck winery and gently de-stemmed into wooden & concrete open-top fermenters. After being basket pressed into stainless steel until primary fermentation is completed, the wine is moved into  French oak barriques from Burgundian winemaker Dominique Laurent. Crafted from wood harvested from Forêt de Tronçais in Allier, the oak trunks were split by hand and then again hand split into staves, producing staves that are almost twice as thick as traditional machine-split staves. These were then aged outdoors for 48 to 54 months before being hand-made into barrels. The Laird is aged for 36 months in its own temperature-controlled stone shed. It is bottled unfined and unfiltered. In Scotland, the lord of the manor is referred to as "The Laird". When the 2005 vintage made its debut at A$700 in 2010, it was the most expensive bottle of wine ever released in Australia. The 2005 vintage received a perfect 100 point score from Lisa Perotti-Brown MW in the December 2010 issue of the Wine Advocate. The 2008 vintage also earned a perfect 100-point score from Perotti-Brown in the February 2013 issue of the Wine Advocate.

Descendant is produced from grapes grown on the winery property from vines planted in 1994 from cuttings selected from several of the vineyards that provide fruit for RunRig. The Shiraz is and Viognier are co-fermented (the usual blend is 92% Shiraz, 8% Viognier) and the wine is aged in neutral (ex-RunRig) barrels for 18 months before bottling. "Descendant" is named in honor of the donor vines that provided the cuttings for this vineyard.

The Factor shares many of its old vine fruit sources with RunRig. Made from 100% Shiraz, it spends 24 months in a combination of new and neutral French oak. The manager on a Scottish highland estate is known as The Factor.

The Struie is a 100% shiraz first released in 2001. It is made from vineyard sites in the Eden Valley (approximately 40-year-old vines) and the Barossa Valley (average 60-year-old vines). The elevation of the Eden Valley is some 200 metres higher than the Barossa and the cooler climate results in a longer growing season and thus more flavor development. Differences in soil between the Eden Valley and Barossa Valley also yield more distinctive varietal flavor characteristics, lower pH and higher acidity levels in the finished wine. The Struie is aged for 18 months in a combination of old and new French oak barriques prior to bottling. The Struie is the name of the craggy hilltop overlooking the Dornoch Firth in the Scottish Highlands.

The Gask is from Greg and Cynthia Knight's small plot of Shiraz on the eastern slope of Mt. McKenzie the Eden Valley that was planted in 1960. It is aged in neutral French oak barrels for 18 months. When he first saw the outcroppings surrounding the Knight's vineyard he was reminded of the stone burial grounds on the hills above the Torbreck forest that are part of the Gask Ridge.

The Celts is a shiraz made from 222 vines in the Descendant Vineyard, adjacent to the Torbreck cellar door on Roennfeldt Road in Marananga. The wines are handmade by David Powell and his sons Callum and Owen. This lowest-production quantity of any Torbreck wine is destemmed into a single wooden open vat (the same one used in 1995 for the first two RunRig components) before being put into four new Burgundian barriques for 26 months of aging prior to release.

Woodcutter's Shiraz is sourced from hand harvested and hand tended, low yielding vines from vineyards in the Marananga, Greenock, Ebenezer, Gomersal, Moppa, Lyndoch & Kalimna subregions of the Barossa Valley. It is then open-top fermented and gently basket pressed, and aged on fine lees for 12 months in large format seasoned barrels and foudres.

The Steading is a blend of 60% Grenache, 20% Shiraz, and 20% Mataró, all sourced from some 45 different vineyard sites from throughout the Barossa Valley. Each block was fermented and aged separately for 24 months in neutral French hogshead barrels. It's an homage to Chateauneuf-du-Pape. On a highland farm, the collection of barns, stables, and outbuildings is known as a Steading.

Cuvée Juveniles is made of 60% Grenache, 20% Shiraz, and 20% Mataró from exactly the same fruit sources used to produce The Steading. The wine's elevage transpires in stainless steel. "Cuvée Juveniles" is named after Tim Johnston's legendary wine bar in Paris. David Powell visited Juveniles Wine Bar in late 1998 and Johnston gave him a glass of Beaujolais Nouveau and suggested that he could do something similar in the Barossa. Beginning with the 1999 vintage, Powell diverted some of the fruit destined for "The Steading" into stainless steel, creating a wine with an emphasis on fruit. The label art was created by Carolyn Johnston, the wine bar proprietor's daughter.

Les Amis is 100% Grenache from dry-farmed bush vines planted in 1901 in western Seppeltsfield. The grapes are hand-harvested and destemmed into a single cement vat before being basket pressed directly into new French barriques for 18 months. The wine was inspired by Powell's restaurateur friend Ignatius Chan, proprietor of Iggy's and Yoshiyuki  in Singapore.

The Natural Wine Project is a collaboration between winemakers Dave Powell and Craig Isbel to create as pure of a wine as possible. Made of 100% Grenache, the fruit comes from Powell's organically-farmed vineyard, planted in 2002 in Marananga. Fermentation occurs without the addition of any foreign materials – no yeast, no acid, no nutrients and bottled sans filtration.

The Pict is 100% Mataró sourced from 85-year-old vines from the Materne ‘Quarry Block’ Vineyard in Northern Barossa. The grapes are destemmed into concrete fermenters and then basket pressed before aging for 24 months in new French barriques. The name comes from the group of Late Iron Age and Early Mediaeval Celtic people living in ancient eastern and northern Scotland.

The Bothie is a semi-sweet dessert wine made from Muscat à Petit Grains from John Nietschke's Ebeneezer vineyard. The grapes are harvested in several stages to achieve different levels of ripeness and a small amount of spirit is added to the fermenting wine to arrest the yeasts against further activity and raise the alcohol level to around 14 percent. When on a hike in Scotland, the place you stop to rest and refresh yourself is called a Bothie, thus this wine's name.

Woodcutter's Semillon is made from the Madeira (more robust and pink-skinned) clone of Semillon. It was one of the early white wine grape varieties planted by the first settlers around 160 years ago and Torbreck sources several old vine vineyards to provide grapes for this wine. The Semillon is hand picked and gently ‘whole bunch’ pressed to individual vats where they were left to settle. After 24 hours the younger blocks were racked to tank while the older, more robust parcels were transferred to six-year-old French barriques where they underwent a long cool fermentation. The components were blended just prior to bottling.

Steading Blanc (formerly known as "Rousanne Marsanne Viognier") is sourced entirely from the Descendant Vineyard planted in 1994 on Roennfeldt Road. The 55% Roussanne 25% Marsanne 20% Viognier blend is made from components harvested separately, with Marsanne and Viognier aging on lees in seasoned (used) barriques for seven months and the Roussanne evolving in stainless steel. The varieties are married just prior to bottling.

Woodcutter's RVM is a lighter, fresher version of the Steading Blanc. The blend is 63% Roussanne 21% Viognier 16% Marsanne and the elevage is similar to that of the Steading Blanc.

References

External links
 Official website

Wineries in South Australia
Barossa Valley
Australian companies established in 1994
Food and drink companies established in 1994